Chalcosyrphus (Xylotomima) metallicus (Weidemann, 1830), the Yellow-legged Leafwalker, is an uncommon species of syrphid fly observed in the southeastern United States. Hoverflies are able to remain nearly motionless while in flight. The adults are also known as flower flies for they are commonly found around and on flowers, from which they get both energy-giving nectar and protein-rich pollen.

References

Eristalinae
Insects described in 1830
Diptera of North America
Hoverflies of North America
Taxa named by Christian Rudolph Wilhelm Wiedemann